The Takua people are an ethnic group of Vietnam. They live in the heavily forested mountainous regions of Quảng Nam and Quảng Ngãi provinces in Central Vietnam.

References

Ethnic groups in Southeast Asia
Indigenous peoples of Southeast Asia